The Infanteriegewehr 1863 was the first Swiss army service rifle to feature a rifled barrel. Like other Swiss infantry weapons of the period, it was retrofitted with a Milbank-Amsler breechloading system from 1867 on.

References
 

Rifles of Switzerland
Early rifles
Muzzleloaders